The Ohio Bobcats men's ice hockey team is a college ice hockey program that represents the Ohio University. The team competes at the American Collegiate Hockey Association (ACHA) Division I and 2 levels as a member of the Central States Collegiate Hockey League (CSCHL).
Ohio University has 2 teams in the ACHA Divisions 1 and 2.

History
Ohio was one of four founding members of the CCHA along with Bowling Green, Ohio State and Saint Louis. The Bobcats played in the CCHA for two seasons but finished dead-last both years. Ohio won only a single conference game in either season and after the 1972–73 season both Ohio and Ohio State left the CCHA. While the Buckeyes kept their team at the varsity level the Bobcats dropped their team back to club status where they have remained as of 2019.

Season-by-Season Results

* Winning percentage is used when conference schedules are unbalanced.

Footnotes

References